Silas Schwarz (born 8 November 1997) is a German professional footballer who plays as a midfielder for TSV Schott Mainz.

Career
Schwarz made his debut in the 3. Liga for Waldhof Mannheim on 21 July 2019, coming on as a substitute in the 87th minute for Valmir Sulejmani in the 1–1 home draw against Chemnitzer FC.

References

External links
 
 Profile at kicker.de

1997 births
Living people
German footballers
Association football midfielders
SV Waldhof Mannheim players
3. Liga players
Regionalliga players